The men's team sprint event in cycling at the 2004 Summer Olympics was contested by twelve teams.  The competition took place on 21 August at the Olympic Velodrome at the Athens Olympic Sports Complex.

Medalists

Results

Qualifying round
The twelve teams of three riders raced the course without competition in the qualifying round.  The top eight qualified for the first round, while the bottom four received final rankings based on their times in the qualifying round.

First round
In the first round of match competition, teams raced head-to-head.  The two fastest winners advanced to the finals, the other two winners competed for the bronze medal and fourth place, and losers received final rankings (fifth through eight places) based on their times in the round.  In this round, Great Britain had the second fastest time overall, but lost their match to Germany and therefore did not advance to the medal round.

Medal round

Final classification
The final classification was

References
General

 Men's Team Sprint: Communiqués 7, 31, 35, 39, and 40.

Specific

M
Cycling at the Summer Olympics – Men's team sprint
Track cycling at the 2004 Summer Olympics
Men's events at the 2004 Summer Olympics